The 125th Fighter Squadron (125 FS) is a unit of the Oklahoma Air National Guard 138th Fighter Wing located at Tulsa Air National Guard Base, Oklahoma. The 125th is equipped with the Block 42 F-16C Fighting Falcon.

The squadron is a descendant organization of the 125th Aero Squadron, established on 30 July 1940. It was one of the 29 original National Guard Observation Squadrons of the United States Army National Guard formed before World War II.

History
The Oklahoma Air National Guard originated during the pre World War II formation of Army National Guard aviation units. In July 1940 the War Department allotted the 125th Observation Squadron to the Oklahoma National Guard. Organized in Tulsa, the squadron was equipped with 0-38 aircraft. It was federally recognized on 31 January 1941.

World War II
Seven months after its federal recognition, the 125th Observation Squadron was federalized and ordered into active service on 15 September 1941.  The 125th was assigned to the 68th Observation Group at Fort Sill. In March 1942 the unit was transferred to the 77th Observation Group. It operated as the 125th Observation Squadron (Light) until July 1942, when it was again designated the 125th Observation Squadron. During the remainder of 1942 it trained with various aircraft at Fort Sill and other installations. In April 1943 the 125th was renamed the 125th Liaison Squadron. Transferred to Texas, it joined the Second Air Force Support Command and was re-equipped with L-5 Sentinel aircraft. In January 1944 the squadron became a part of the 76th Tactical Reconnaissance Group.

The 125th arrived in England in June 1944 and was assigned to the Ninth Air Force. Deployed to the U.S. Ninth Army, units of the 125th arrived in France in August 1944 and served with the Twelfth and Sixth army groups. In November 1944 the 125th was assigned to the XIX Tactical Air Command (Provisional) and then to the IX Fighter Command. After V-E Day the 125th was transferred to the XII Tactical Air Command of the Army of Occupation.

Oklahoma Air National Guard
The wartime 125th Liaison Squadron was re-designated as the 125th Fighter Squadron and allotted to the Oklahoma Air National Guard, on 24 May 1946. It was organized at Tulsa Municipal Airport, Oklahoma, and was extended federal recognition on 15 February 1947 by the National Guard Bureau. The 1125th Fighter Squadron was bestowed the history, honors, and colors of the 125th Liaison Squadron and all predecessor units. The squadron was equipped with F-51D Mustang Fighters and was assigned to the Missouri ANG 71st Fighter Wing, an umbrella unit of early ANG units in the midwest.   The squadron was assigned the mission for air defense of the State of Oklahoma.

On 18 December 1947, the 125th FS was transferred to the newly recognized Oklahoma ANG 137th Fighter Group and joined the 185th Fighter Squadron at Norman.  The Norman-based 137th Fighter Group provided command and logistical support.  The 125th then performed training missions over Northern Oklahoma and the panhandle; the 188th trained over Southern Oklahoma to the Texas border.

In June 1950, the 125th began re-equipping from F-51D Mustangs to F-84B Thunderjets.  The F-84s were received from Republic after refurbishing, the aircraft seeing previous service with the 14th or 20th Fighter Groups.

Korean War federalization
The 125th and its parent 137th Fighter Group were federalized and ordered to active service on 10 October 1950 due to the Korean War, becoming part of Ninth Air Force, Tactical Air Command (TAC).  On 27 November 1950, it was moved to Alexandria AFB, Louisiana, where it was joined with the Kansas ANG 127th Fighter Squadron and Georgia ANG 128th Fighter Squadron. The 137th Fighter-Bomber Wing was scheduled for deployment to the new Chaumont-Semoutiers AB, France, as part of the United States Air Forces in Europe (USAFE).

At Alexandria, the unit was scheduled for conversion training in the F-84G Thunderjet. Deployment of the wing was delayed, however, by the need to transfer its pilots to Korea from training and delays in receiving engines for the F-84Gs, as well as the ongoing construction at Chaumont AB. As no F-84Gs were available, F-84Ds were furnished by TAC and along with the F-84Bs, the unit trained in the jet aircraft.

Training and delays continued throughout 1951. Due to these delays, many of the activated National Guard airmen were released from active duty and never deployed to France. F-84G models were finally received in the spring of 1951 and the Guardsmen were able to train in long-range endurance missions. However, ongoing delays in France kept the 137th in Louisiana for over a year.

With mostly regular Air Force personnel and all the delays behind them, the remaining Guardsmen departed Louisiana on 5 May 1952 for Europe; however, the 128th inherited a base that was little more than acres of mud where wheat fields used to be. The only hardened facilities at Chaumont were a concrete runway and a handful of tarpaper shacks. The 127th wound up being stationed by USAFE at Neubiberg Air Base, West Germany until the facilities in France were suitable for military use. The aircraft arrived at Chaumont on 25 June, being the first USAF tactical air fighters to be based permanently in France, albeit working mostly in tents and temporary wooden buildings on their new base.

The Guardsmen of the 125th ended their active-duty tour in France and returned to the United States in late June, leaving their F-84G Thunderjets in Europe.

Air Defense mission
The 125th returned from France and was reformed in Tulsa in July 1952, being assigned to Tactical Air Command as a Fighter-Bomber squadron.  It was re-equipped with F-51D Mustangs, owing to the lack of jet aircraft available.  The squadron continued to train in the Mustang until 1954 when obsolescent F-80C Shooting Star jets were received.

In 1957 the Oklahoma Air National Guard was given a fighter-interceptor mission in Air Defense Command (ADC), and on 1 August, the 125th Fighter-Bomber Squadron was authorized to expand to a group level.  The 138th Fighter-Interceptor Group was authorized and extended federal recognition by the National Guard Bureau. The 125th Fighter-Interceptor Squadron becoming the group's flying unit. Other support squadrons assigned into the group were the 138th Headquarters, 138th Material Squadron (Maintenance), 138th Combat Support Squadron, and the 138th USAF Dispensary.

With the Fighter-Interceptor mission assignment, the 125th also assumed ADC runway alert program on full 24-hour basis – with armed jet fighters ready to "scramble" at a moment's notice. This event brought the group into the daily combat operational program of the USAF, placing us on "the end of the runway" alongside regular USAF-Air Defense Fighter Squadrons. The obsolescent F-80 day fighters were upgraded to the all-weather/day/night F-86D Sabre Interceptor by the end of the year. In June 1959 the squadron traded their F-86Ds for the upgraded F-86L Sabre Interceptor with uprated afterburning engines and new electronics.

Air Transport mission
In January 1960, the 138th FIS was reassigned to Military Air Transport Service (MATS), trading in its Sabre interceptors for 4-engined C-97 Stratofreighter transports. With air transportation recognized as a critical wartime need, the unit was re-designated the 138th Air Transport Wing (Heavy) with the 125th Air Transport Squadron. During the 1961 Berlin Crisis, both the Group and squadron were federalized on 1 October 1961. From Tulsa, the 125th ATS augmented MATS airlift capability worldwide in support of the Air Force’s needs. It returned again to Oklahoma state control on 31 August 1962. Throughout the 1960s, the 125th flew long-distance transport missions in support of Air Force requirements, frequently sending aircraft to the Caribbean, Europe, Australia, Hawaii, Japan, the Philippines, and during the Vietnam War, to both South Vietnam, Okinawa and Thailand.  The C-97s were retired in 1968 and the unit was transferred to Military Airlift Command (MAC), being re-equipped with C-124C Globemaster II heavy transports.  The Group continued to fly long-distance intercontinental airlift flights until the Globemasters were retired at the end of 1972.

Tactical Fighter mission

With the retirement of the Globemasters, the 138th was transferred to Tactical Air Command on 25 January 1973, with the 125th Tactical Fighter Squadron being re-equipped with veteran F-100D/F Super Sabre tactical fighter bombers that were returning from the Vietnam War.  The Super Sabre was dedicated fighter-bomber, with no concession being made to a secondary air-superiority role and the squadron trained in using the fighter for ground support. Beginning in 1975, the 125th began a NATO commitment, with squadron aircraft and personnel deploying to the United States Air Forces in Europe (USAFE) for Autumn Forge/Cold Fire/Reforger exercises.

In 1978, the F-100s were being retired, and they were replaced with A-7D Corsair II subsonic tactical close air support aircraft from the 23d Tactical Fighter Wing, England AFB, Louisiana along with the 354th Tactical Fighter Wing, Myrtle Beach AFB, South Carolina which were converting to the A-10 Thunderbolt II.  The aircraft had excellent accuracy with the aid of an automatic electronic navigation and weapons delivery system. Although designed primarily as a ground attack aircraft, it also had limited air-to-air combat capability.   In 1980, the 125th received the new twin-seat A-7K trainer and also received the Low Altitude Night Attack modification to the A-7D.

Modern era

Early in the 1990s with the declared end of the Cold War and the continued decline in military budgets, the Air Force restructured to meet changes in strategic requirements, decreasing personnel, and a smaller infrastructure. The 138th adopted the new USAF "Objective Organization" in early 1992, with the word "tactical" being eliminated from its designation and becoming the 138th Fighter Group. Tactical Air Command was inactivated on 1 June, being replaced by the new Air Combat Command (ACC).

The 125th Fighter Squadron flew A-7D's until 1993 when it began to receive Block 42 F-16C/D Fighting Falcons, replacing the venerable A-7D in the attack roles. Most of these aircraft came from the 51st Fighter Wing, Osan Air Base, South Korea and the 20th Fighter Wing, Shaw AFB, South Carolina, which units' were trading in Block 42 for more advanced F-16s.  The 125th, although an Air National Guard unit, which were mostly tasked with air defense of US mainland, was tasked with a conventional attack mission. This was already the case in the A-7D and even in the F-100 era. The squadron was one of the first Air National Guard units to be equipped with the Low Altitude Navigation and Targeting Infrared for Night, or LANTIRN system to be able to illuminate their own ground targets. At the time of conversion this unit was one of the most advanced within the Air National Guard.

In mid-1996, the Air Force, in response to budget cuts, and changing world situations, began experimenting with Air Expeditionary organizations. The Air Expeditionary Force (AEF) concept was developed that would mix Active-Duty, Reserve and Air National Guard elements into a combined force. Instead of entire permanent units deploying as "Provisional" as in the 1991 Gulf War, Expeditionary units are composed of "aviation packages" from several wings, including active-duty Air Force, the Air Force Reserve Command and the Air National Guard, would be married together to carry out the assigned deployment rotation.

In October 1996, the 125th Expeditionary Fighter Squadron (125 EFS) was first formed from 138th FW personnel and aircraft and deployed to Incirlik Air Base, Turkey, to join with other active-duty and national guard squadrons as part of Operation Northern Watch. This mission was part of a multi-unit Air National Guard "rainbow" deployment involving the Air National Guard block 42 F-16 squadrons. Each squadron provided eight aircraft to a total of 24 aircraft deployed.  The 125th EFS returned to Tulsa and was inactivated on 7 January 1997.   Further Northern Watch activations of the 125th EFS and subsequent deployments to Incirlik AB occurred in the spring of 1998 and fall of 2001.

In 2011, the 125th EFS deployed to Al Assad Iraq for the final time, when more than 200 members deployed there to provide air support to the final drawdown of U.S. and coalition forces, being able to respond quickly to any needs troops in combat may have as they left the country.

Lineage

 Designated 125th Observation Squadron, and allotted to the Oklaholma NG, on 30 July 1940
 Activated on 10 February 1941
 Ordered into active service on 15 September 1941
 Re-designated: 125th Observation Squadron (Light) on 13 January 1942
 Re-designated: 125th Observation Squadron on 4 July 1942
 Re-designated: 125th Liaison Squadron on 2 April 1943
 Inactivated on 15 December 1945
 Re-designated: 125th Fighter Squadron, and allotted to the Oklahoma ANG, on 24 May 1946
 Extended federal recognition on 15 February 1947
 Re-designated: 125th Fighter Squadron (Jet) on 1 March 1950
 Federalized and ordered to active service on: 10 October 1950
 Re-designated: 125th Fighter-Bomber Squadron on 1 November 1950
 Released from active duty and returned to Oklahoma state control, 10 July 1952
 Re-designated: 125th Fighter-Interceptor Squadron on 1 August 1957
 Re-designated: 125th Air Transport Squadron on 15 January 1960
 Federalized and ordered to active service on: 1 October 1961
 Released from active duty and returned to Oklahoma state control, 31 August 1962
 Re-designated: 125th Military Airlift Squadron on 8 January 1966
 Re-designated: 125th Tactical Fighter Squadron on 25 January 1973
 Re-designated: 125th Fighter Squadron on 15 March 1992
 Components designated as: 125th Expeditionary Fighter Squadron when deployed as part of an Air and Space Expeditionary unit after June 1996.

Assignments
 Oklahoma National Guard, 10 February 1941
 68th Observation Group, 15 September 1941
 77th Observation (later Reconnaissance) Group, 12 March 1942
 II Air Support Command (later II Tactical Air Division), 11 August 1943
 III (later I) Tactical Air Division, c. 11 October 1943
 Attached to 76th Tactical Reconnaissance Group to Jan 1944
 United States Strategic Air Forces in Europe, 4 June 1944
 Ninth Air Force, 7 June 1944
 Attached principally to Headquarters Command, European Theater of Operations, 7 Jun-17 Jul 1944
 Attached to: United States Ninth Army, 17 Jul-15 Nov 1944
 Attached to: XXIX Tactical Air Command [Prov] beginning 15 November 1944
 IX Fighter Command, 1 December 1944
 Attached to: XXIX Tactical Air Command [Prov]
 Further attached to: Twelfth Army Group, 15 Nov 1944 – 8 Jun 1945
 Principally attached to: Sixth Army Group, 8 Jun-25 Jul 1945
 XII Tactical Air Command, 20 Jun-15 Dec 1945
 Attached to Headquarters Command, US Forces, European Theater, 25 Jul-15 Dec 1945
 71st Fighter Wing, 15 February 1947
 137th Fighter Group, 18 December 1947
 137th Fighter Bomber Group, 1 November 1950
 138th Fighter-Interceptor Group, 1 August 1957
 138th Air Transport Group, 15 January 1960
 Attached to: 133d Air Transport Wing, 1 October 1961 – 31 August 1962
 138th Military Airlift Group, 8 January 1966
 138th Tactical Fighter Group, 25 January 1973
 138th Fighter Group, 15 March 1992
 138th Operations Group, 1 October 1995 – Present

Stations

 Tulsa Municipal Airport, Oklahoma, 10 February 1941
 Post Field, Oklahoma, 20 September 1941
 Brownwood Army Airfield, Texas 15 April 1942
 Abilene Army Airfield, Texas, 29 June 1942
 DeRidder Army Airbase, Louisiana, 26 July 1942
 Abilene Army Airfield, Texas, 27 September 1942
 Alamo Field, Texas, 1 July 1943
 Desert Center Army Airfield, California, 11 October 1943
 Thermal Army Airfield, California, 11 Nov 1943 – 18 May 1944
 RAF Staverton, England, c. 8 June 1944
 RAF Chedworth, England, 19 June 1944
 RAF Erlestokes, England, 9 July 1944
 Detachments operated from France after 23 August 1944

 St Sauveur-Lendelin Airfield, France, 1 September 1944
 Rennes Airfield (A-27), France, 3 September 1944
 Arlon Airfield, Belgium, c. 1 October 1944
 Maastricht Airfield (Y-44), Holland, 21 October 1944
 Munchen-Gladbach Airfield (Y-56), Germany, 9 March 1945
 Haltern Airfield, Germany, 4 April 1945
 Gütersloh Airfield (Y-99), Germany, 12 April 1945
 Brunswick/Waggum Airfield (R-37), Germany, 24 April 1945
 AAF Station Heidelberg, Germany, 10 June 1945
 AAF Station Frankfurt, Germany, 25 Jul-15 Dec 1945
 Tulsa Municipal Airport, Oklahoma, 15 February 1947
 Tulsa International Airport, 28 August 1963
 Designated: Tulsa Air National Guard Base, 1991–Present

Major Deployments

 Korean War federalization
 Operated from: Alexandria AFB, Louisiana, 27 November 1950 – 4 May 1952
 Operated from: Chaumont-Semoutiers AB, France, 13 May 1952 – 10 July 1952
 1961 Berlin Crisis federalization
 Tulsa Municipal Airport, 1 October 1961 – 31 August 1962 (Did not deploy)
 Operation Northern Watch (AEF)
 Operated from: Incirlik Air Base, Turkey, 9 October 1996 – 7 January 1997
 Operated from: Incirlik Air Base, Turkey, March–May 1998
 Operated from: Incirlik Air Base, Turkey, 1999
 Operated from: Incirlik Air Base, Turkey, September–October 2001

 Operation Southern Watch (AEF)
 Operated from: Prince Sultan Air Base, Saudi Arabia, 2000
 Operated from: Al Jaber Air Base, Kuwait, 11 September–November 2001
 Operation Iraqi Freedom (AEF)
 Operated from: Al Udeid Air Base, Qatar, 20 May–July 2005
 Operated from: Balad Air Base, Iraq, 27 June–August 2007
 Operated from: Balad Air Base, Iraq, 18 September–November 2008
 Operation New Dawn (AEF)
 Operated from: (Undisclosed location), Iraq, 28 September-18 November 2011

Aircraft

 Douglas O-38E, 1941–1942
 O-49 Vigilant, 1941–1943
 O-59 Grasshopper, 1941–1943
 O-58C Grasshopper, 1941–1943
 North American O-47, 1942
 O-52 Owl, 1942
 L-5 Grasshopper, 1943–1945
 F-51D Mustang, 1947–1950; 1952–1954
 F-84B Thunderjet, 1950–1951
 F-84D Thunderjet, 1950–1951

 F-84G Thunderjet, 1951–1952
 F-80C Shooting Star, 1954–1957
 F-86D Sabre Interceptor, 1957–1959
 F-86L Sabre Interceptor, 1959–1960
 C-97G Stratofreighter, 1960–1968
 C-124C Globemaster II, 1968–1973
 F-100D/F Super Sabre, 1973–1978
 A-7D/K Corsair II, 1978–1993
 Block 42 F-16C/D Fighting Falcon, 1993–Present

See also

 List of observation squadrons of the United States Army National Guard

References

 Maurer, Maurer. Combat Squadrons of the Air Force: World War II. Maxwell Air Force Base, Alabama: Office of Air Force History, 1982.
 History of the Oklahoma Air National Guard
 125th Fighter Squadron history
 F-16.net 125th Fighter Squadron
 Rogers, B. (2006). United States Air Force Unit Designations Since 1978. 
  Cornett, Lloyd H. and Johnson, Mildred W., A Handbook of Aerospace Defense Organization  1946 – 1980, Office of History, Aerospace Defense Center, Peterson AFB, CO (1980).

External links

Squadrons of the United States Air National Guard
Fighter squadrons of the United States Air Force
Military units and formations in Oklahoma